"Sonny's Dream" (also known as "Sonny") is a folk song written by Newfoundlander Ron Hynes in 1976. It tells the story of a man who wishes to fulfill his dreams, but is bound to his rural homeland by his family, particularly his lonely mother. Hynes wrote the song while on a roadtrip with his band in western Canada and based it on his uncle, Thomas "Sonny" O'Neill, who had taught him how to play guitar and had pushed him play music professionally. It was first recorded by The Wonderful Grand Band on their eponymous album, but appeared re-recorded on their second album Living in a Fog in 1981. Subsequent to the songwriter Ron Hynes' death, a crowd was organized for a singalong in Bannerman Park, St. John's in remembrance and celebration of his life.

The song is popular not only in Atlantic Canada, but in some parts of the United States and has been covered by many other artists, including Hamish Imlach, Great Big Sea, Christy Moore, Emmylou Harris, Stan Rogers, Valdy, Allison Crowe, Hayley Westenra,  Jean Redpath, and Corey Hart.

Scottish and Irish versions 
The song was heard by Scottish artist Hamish Imlach while on a trip to Canada, who modified it somewhat and played it in folk-clubs in Britain. There it was heard by Christy Moore who recorded it and passed it on to other artists in Ireland. A version titled "Sonny" was recorded by Mary Black for the compilation album, A Woman's Heart, which became the best-selling album in Irish history.

List of cover versions

Chart performance

See also
 50 Tracks#50 Tracks: The Canadian Edition (2005)

References

Ron Hynes songs
1976 songs
1981 singles
Canadian folk songs
Songs written by Ron Hynes